Lieler is a village in the commune of Clervaux, in northern Luxembourg.  , the village had a population of 168.

Heinerscheid
Villages in Luxembourg